Henshall is a surname. Notable people with the surname include:

Alex Henshall (born 1994), English footballer
Audrey Henshall (born 1927), British archaeologist
Daniel Henshall (born 1982), Australian actor
Douglas Henshall (born 1965), Scottish actor
Hugh Henshall (1734-1816), English civil engineer
Horace Henshall (1889-1951), English footballer
James Henshall (1907-1969), English footballer
James Alexander Henshall (1836-1925), American author
John Henry Henshall (1856-1928), English artist
May Dexter Henshall (1867–1962), American educator, clubwoman, and librarian
Nicholas Henshall (born 1962), Anglican dean
Michael Henshall, English Church of England bishop
Paul Henshall (born 1977), British actor
Richard Henshall (born 1984), English musician
Ruthie Henshall (born 1967), British singer, dancer and actress
Samuel Henshall (1764/5–1807), English clergyman, writer and inventor of type of corkscrew
Scott Henshall (born 1975), British fashion designer